Egbert Warnderink "E. W." Swackhamer Jr. (January 17, 1927 – December 5, 1994) was an American television and film director.

Career
Swackhamer's credits included M*A*S*H, L.A. Law, Murder, She Wrote, Bewitched, The Partridge Family and The Flying Nun. Of the 27 pilots for television series directed by Swackhamer, 18 went into regular production, including Law & Order, Eight Is Enough, Quincy, M.E., S.W.A.T. and Nancy Drew.

Swackhamer was the stage manager for the original Broadway production of Cat on a Hot Tin Roof. He went to Hollywood in 1961, after working on and off-Broadway and for national companies as an actor, stage manager and director. Swackhamer received an Emmy Award for directing the six-hour miniseries The Dain Curse during the 1977–78 season.

He was the father of Ten Eyck Swackhamer and Elizabeth Swackhamer with his first wife, Gretchen Shane. He married actress Bridget Hanley on April 26, 1969 and they had two daughters, Bronwyn (born March 3, 1971) and Meagan. He was working as a director on Star Command at the time of his death, of a ruptured aortic aneurysm, on December 5, 1994.

Selected filmography

 The Cosby Mysteries (2 episodes, 1994)
 MacShayne: The Final Roll of the Dice (1994) (TV)
 Law & Order (8 episodes, 1990–1993)
 The Secret Passion of Robert Clayton (1992) (TV)
 Are You Lonesome Tonight (1992) (TV)
 Lookwell (1991) (TV)
 Columbo: Columbo Goes to College (1990) (TV)
 Jake and the Fatman (8 episodes, 1987–1990)
 H.E.L.P. (1990) TV series (unknown episodes)
 In the Heat of the Night (2 episodes, 1989)
 Christine Cromwell - "Things That Go Bump in the Night" (1989) TV episode
 Desperado: The Outlaw Wars (1989) (TV)
 Murder, She Wrote - "Deadpan" (1988) TV episode
 Desperado: The Return of Desperado (1988) (TV)
 The Wizard (3 episodes, 1986)
 L.A. Law - "The House of the Rising Flan" (1986) TV episode
 Bridge Across Time (1985) (TV)
 The Rousters (1983) (TV)
 Malibu (1983) (TV)
 Cocaine and Blue Eyes (1983) (TV)
 Carpool (1983) (TV)
 Disneyland - "Tales of the Apple Dumpling Gang" (1982) TV episode
 The Oklahoma City Dolls (1981) (TV)
 Longshot (1981)
 Tenspeed and Brown Shoe - "Pilot" (1980) TV episode
 The Death of Ocean View Park (1979) (TV)
 Vampire (1979) (TV)
 The Winds of Kitty Hawk (1978) (TV)
 The Dain Curse (1978) TV mini-series
 Family (2 episodes, 1977)
 Spider-Man (1977) (TV)
 Eight Is Enough - "Never Try Eating Nectarines Since Juice May Dispense" (1977) TV episode
 The Hardy Boys/Nancy Drew Mysteries - "The Mystery of Pirate's Cove" (1977) TV episode
 Once an Eagle (1976) TV mini-series
 Quincy, M.E. - "Go Fight City Hall... to the Death" (1976) TV episode
 Death at Love House (1976) (TV)
 McCloud (4 episodes, 1975–1976)
 Switch (2 episodes, 1975)
 S.W.A.T. - "S.W.A.T.: Part 1" (1975) TV episode
 The Rookies (11 episodes, 1972–1975)
 Death Sentence (1974)
 Chopper One (2 episodes, 1974)
 The New Perry Mason (2 episodes, 1973)
 Roll Out - "The Paper Caper" (1973) TV episode
 The Girl with Something Extra - "No Benefit of Doubt" (1973) TV episode
 The Partridge Family (8 episodes, 1970–1973)
 Anna and the King - "The Chimes" (1972) TV episode
 Bonanza - "Stallion" (1972) TV episode
 Owen Marshall: Counselor at Law - "The Trouble with Ralph" (1972) TV episode
 M*A*S*H - "Chief Surgeon Who?" (1972) TV episode
 Bewitched (8 episodes, 1965–1972)
 Gidget Gets Married (1972) (TV)
 Love, American Style (1971) TV episode (segment "Love and the Reincarnation")
 The Young Rebels - "Fort Hope" (1970) TV episode
 Here Come the Brides (6 episodes, 1968–1969)
 The Outcasts (2 episodes, 1968–1969)
 The Flying Nun (9 episodes, 1967–1968)
 Love on a Rooftop (12 episodes, 1966–1967)
 Hazel (7 episodes, 1965–1966)
 Gidget (8 episodes, 1965–1966)
 I Dream of Jeannie (5 episodes, 1965–1966)
 The Donna Reed Show (2 episodes, 1965)
 The Lieutenant'' - "O'Rourke" (1964) TV episode

References

External links
 

1927 births
1994 deaths
American television directors
People from Middletown Township, New Jersey
Film directors from New Jersey